Tommy Taggart (born May 17, 1986) is an American football fullback who is currently a free agent. He played college football at Oklahoma where he was a defensive tackle. He was signed as an undrafted free agent by the Bossier-Shreveport Battle Wings in 2009.

In 2015, Taggart was assigned to the Philadelphia Soul.

References

External links
 Arena Football League Bio

1986 births
Living people
American football fullbacks
Midwestern State Mustangs football players
Oklahoma Sooners football players
Bossier–Shreveport Battle Wings players
Dallas Vigilantes players
New Orleans VooDoo players
San Jose SaberCats players
Pittsburgh Power players
Philadelphia Soul players